Josep Raich Garriga (August 28, 1913 – 25 July 1988) was a Spanish footballer of Catalan origin who played for Joventut FC, CE Júpiter and FC Barcelona in Spain and FC Sète and Troyes AC in France. He played once for Spain in 1941.

Career
Born in Molins de Rei, Raich began playing football with local amateurs Joventut FC. He became a professional with FC Barcelona, where he made his La Liga debut during the 1933–34 season.

His hometown football club, Penya Blaugrana "Josep Raich" Molins de Rei, and its stadium were renamed in his honor in 1995.

References

External links
 La Liga profile
 Profile

1913 births
1988 deaths
Footballers from Catalonia
Spanish footballers
Spain international footballers
La Liga players
FC Barcelona players
FC Sète 34 players
Ligue 1 players
ES Troyes AC players
Ligue 2 players
Expatriate footballers in France
Association football midfielders
Catalonia international footballers